James Joseph Boyle (November 15, 1891 - June 7, 1970) served in the California State Assembly for the 66th district from 1933 to 1939 and during World War I he served in the United States Army.

References

External links

United States Army personnel of World War I
20th-century American politicians
Democratic Party members of the California State Assembly
1891 births
1970 deaths
Politicians from New York City